Rıdvan Akar (born 1961,) is a Turkish journalist and author. He has contributed to Söz, Ekonomik Panorama, Tempo, Milliyet. He has been editor-in-chief of the news programme 32. Gün (CNN Turk / Kanal D). Together with Hikmet Bila and Mehmet Ali Birand, he has authored five editions of a book on the 1980 Turkish coup d'état. He is known for his work on history, politics and minorities in Turkey; he has also published a novel, Bir Irkçının İhaneti (Betrayal of a Racist, 2002).

He was educated at Gazi University and Istanbul University.

Books
 Varlık Vergisi Kanunu: tek parti rejiminde azınlık karşıtı politika örneği  (1992). Belge Yayınları
 12 Eylül: Türkiye'nin miladı (1999, with Hikmet Bila and Mehmet Ali Birand; 5th edition 2006). Doğan Kitap
 Bir Irkçının İhaneti (2006). Doğan Kitap
 Ecevit ve gizli arşivi (2008, with Can Dündar). İmge Kitabevi
 Aşkale Yolcuları (2009). Doğan Kitap

References

External links
 CNN Turk
 T24

1961 births
Turkish journalists
Ankara University Faculty of Political Sciences alumni
Turkish novelists
Living people
Milliyet people